The Mooreville Chalk is a geological formation in North America, within the U.S. states of Alabama and Mississippi, which were part of the subcontinent of Appalachia. The strata date back to the early Santonian to the early Campanian stage of the Late Cretaceous. The chalk was formed by pelagic sediments deposited along the eastern edge of the Mississippi embayment. It is a unit of the Selma Group and consists of the upper Arcola Limestone Member and an unnamed lower member.  Dinosaur, mosasaur, and primitive bird remains are among the fossils that have been recovered from the Mooreville Chalk Formation.

Fish

Cartilaginous fish

Bony fish

Reptiles

Dinosaurs
Indeterminate hadrosaurid, nodosaurid, dinosaur egg, and ornithomimosaur fossils are known from Mooreville Chalk outcrops in Alabama. The nodosaurid remains most likely belong to a new taxon.

Mosasaurs

Plesiosaurs

Pterosaurs

Turtles

See also 

 List of dinosaur-bearing rock formations
 List of fossil sites

References 

 
Upper Cretaceous Series of North America
Geologic formations of Alabama
Geologic formations of Mississippi
Chalk